Ndubuisi is a given name. Notable people with the given name include:

Ndubuisi Egbo (born 1973), Nigerian football manager and former footballer
Ndubuisi Ekekwe (born 1975), Nigerian professor, inventor, engineer, author and entrepreneur
Ndubuisi Eze (born 1984), Nigerian footballer
Ndubuisi Kanu (born 1943), Nigerian military governor
Ndubuisi Okosieme (born 1966), Nigerian footballer